Radical 39 or radical child meaning "child" or "seed" is one of the 31 Kangxi radicals (214 radicals total) composed of three strokes.

In the Kangxi Dictionary, there are 83 characters (out of 49,030) to be found under this radical.

 is also the 54th indexing component in the Table of Indexing Chinese Character Components predominantly adopted by Simplified Chinese dictionaries published in mainland China.

In Chinese astrology, 子 represents the first Earthly Branch and corresponds to the Rat in the Chinese zodiac.

Evolution

Derived characters

Literature

External links

Unihan Database - U+5B50

039
054